The 1988 Southern 500, the 39th running of the event, was a NASCAR Winston Cup Series racing event that took place on September 4, 1988, at Darlington Raceway in Darlington, South Carolina.

All the wives of the participating NASCAR drivers received a special racing pass that allowed them to access all aspects of racing life except for the pits where the drivers' crews did their actual work.

Background

Darlington Raceway, nicknamed by many NASCAR fans and drivers "The Lady in Black" or "The Track Too Tough to Tame" and advertised as a "NASCAR tradition", is a race track built for NASCAR racing located near Darlington, South Carolina. It is of a unique, somewhat egg-shaped design, an oval with the ends of very different configurations, a condition which supposedly arose from the proximity of one end of the track to a minnow pond the owner refused to relocate. This situation makes it very challenging for the crews to set up their cars' handling in a way that will be effective at both ends.

The track is a four-turn  oval. The track's first two turns are banked at twenty-five degrees, while the final two turns are banked two degrees lower at twenty-three degrees. The front stretch (the location of the finish line) and the back stretch are banked at six degrees. Darlington Raceway can seat up to 60,000 people.

Summary
Four drivers failed to qualify for this race, which had ten cautions for a whopping 49 laps. 74000 people attended the race to see 367 laps of racing action; last-place finisher Harry Gant only finished 50 of them due to engine difficulties. Twenty-four different changes were made for the first-place position of the race. Both Richard Petty and his son Kyle competed in this race. Notable drivers at the race also included Darrell Waltrip, Terry Labonte, and Alan Kulwicki.

Despite being the 21st round of the 1988 NASCAR Winston Cup Series, this was the first Cup race in 1988 to have any driver get the pole, lead the most laps and win. Rusty Wallace fared fairly well at this race; he just could never win the race because Bill Elliott was already ahead for at least four lengths car lengths in turns 3 and 4.

Just like in 1985, Elliott dominated and won the Southern 500 and left there leading the points. Unlike in 1985, the Melling team had a strong, consistent run to the end of the season to claim the Winston Cup title for 1988.

Two different drivers were involved in accidents: Derrike Cope on lap 203 and Ken Ragan on lap 308. A stock car carrying the Ford manufacturer won the race while Chevrolet was the official manufacturer of the last-place finisher. The total purse of the race was $431,345 ($ when adjusted for inflation); with the winner taking $75,800 of the purse ($ when adjusted for inflation).

From the following year to the end of the autumn Southern 500 races in 2004, a sponsor's name would be added to the overall race name; reducing the traditionalism surrounding the early "Southern 500" races.

Timeline
Section reference:
 Start: Bill Elliott was ahead of the other drivers as the green flag was waved.
 Lap 41: NASCAR officials gave out a competition caution, caution ended on lap 44.
 Lap 50: Harry Gant had to leave the race because his vehicle's engine stopped working properly.
 Lap 54: Caution due to Morgan Shepherd's engine failure, caution ended on lap 60.
 Lap 82: Rick Wilson's vehicle had engine problems and had to leave the race.
 Lap 113: Jimmy Horton had to leave the race due to engine failure.
 Lap 130: Caution due to Brett Bodine causing terminal damage to his vehicle, caution ended on lap 132.
 Lap 135: Randy Baker had to leave the race due to a problematic engine.
 Lap 167: Caution due to Rick Mast causing terminal damage to his vehicle on turn 1, caution ended on lap 170.
 Lap 206: Caution due to Derrike Cope causing terminal damage to his vehicle on turn 4, caution ended on lap 208.
 Lap 236: Caution due to Richard Petty causing terminal damage to his vehicle on turn 2, caution ended on lap 239.
 Lap 239: Dale Jarrett had to the leave the race due to engine difficulties.
 Lap 257: Caution due to Ken Bouchard spinning out on the front stretch, caution ended on lap 260.
 Lap 302: Caution due to H.B. Bailey spinning out on turn 4, caution ended on lap 305.
 Lap 312: Caution due to debris in the backstretch, caution ended on lap 314.
 Lap 317: Bobby Hillin Jr. had to leave the race due to oil pressure problems.
 Lap 328: Caution due to Ken Ragan causing terminal damage to his vehicle on turn 4, caution ended on lap 330.
 Finish: Bill Elliott was officially declared the winner of the event.

Official results

References

Southern 500
Southern 500
Southern 500
NASCAR races at Darlington Raceway